On 14 April 2015, Al-Shabaab militants launched a suicide car bomb and shooting attack on the Ministry of Higher Education and Ministry of Petroleum and Resources building in Mogadishu. Special forces quickly reseized the compound, killing the attackers.

Overview
The attack began when a suicide car bomb detonated at the gate of the Ministry of Higher Education and Ministry of Petroleum and Resources building in Mogadishu. The compound is situated near the KM4 junction, which was often used by government officials during travels to and from the country. Armed insurgents in military fatigues subsequently penetrated the premises. However, no senior government officials were on the grounds. According to witnesses, there were between two or three gunmen, who were armed with light and heavy weapons and had on suicide vests.

Special Forces units arrived at the compound shortly afterwards, and quickly recaptured control of the area after a brief exchange in gunfire with the militants. Interior Minister Abdirizak Omar indicated that the security forces also rescued dozens of individuals. Additionally, a federal government spokesman stated that casualties included seven Al-Shabaab militants, eight pedestrians and two soldiers. Around 15 people were also wounded and were taken to the hospital for treatment.

Al-Shabaab later claimed responsibility for the attack. Analysts suggested that the fact that the group had begun resorting to raids against soft targets reflected its structural weakness, as the militants were no longer able to mount large counterstrikes against Somali army and AMISOM positions.

See also
2015 timeline of the War in Somalia

References

Attacks in Africa in 2015
Al-Shabaab (militant group) attacks
Somali Civil War (2009–present)
21st century in Mogadishu
Suicide bombings in Somalia
Terrorist incidents in Somalia in 2015
Mass shootings in Africa
Mass murder in 2015
April 2015 crimes in Africa
April 2015 events in Africa
Attacks on government buildings and structures